Mihkli is a village in Lääneranna Parish, Pärnu County in southwestern Estonia.

See also
 Mihkli Nature Reserve

References

Villages in Pärnu County
Kreis Wiek